The Women's Suffrage Journal was a magazine founded by Lydia Becker and Jessie Boucherett in 1870. Initially titled the Manchester National Society for Women's Suffrage Journal within a year its title was changed reflecting Becker's desire to extend its influence beyond "Manchester's radical liberal elite". It carried news of events affecting all areas of women's lives, and particularly focused on features that demonstrated the breadth of support among the general population for women's suffrage in the United Kingdom. It also frequently published guidance on how to prepare a petition to be presented to the House of Commons.

Publication ceased in 1890 following Becker's death. The final edition contained this note:

See also
List of suffragists and suffragettes
List of women's rights activists
Timeline of women's suffrage
Women's suffrage

References

Notes

Bibliography 

Defunct women's magazines published in the United Kingdom
English-language magazines
Feminism in England
Feminist magazines
Independent magazines
Magazines established in 1870
Magazines disestablished in 1890
Magazines published in Manchester
Women's suffrage in the United Kingdom